Khatyrka is a meteorite found in 2011 in the valley of the Iomrautvaam, a tributary of the Khatyrka river, Chukotka Autonomous Okrug, Russian Far East. It is a CV3 (oxidized) chondrite meteorite.

History
Nine small pieces were found, each less than 1 mm in size, buried in a 7,000-year-old layer of dirt. It was named Khatyrka meteorite.

Specimens
Three representative fragments were deposited at the Department of Mineral Sciences, NHB-119, National Museum of Natural History, Smithsonian Institution.

See also 
 Glossary of meteoritics
 Khatyrkite
 Quasicrystal

Notes

External links 

 Meteoritical Bulletin Database

Meteorites found in Russia